The Perth tramway network served Perth, the capital city of Western Australia, from 1899 until 1958. The network was initially run by a private company but was taken over by the state government in 1913. From a single line along Hay Street, the network expanded north as far as Osborne Park, east as far as Welshpool, south as far as Como, and west as far as Claremont. The tramways were gradually replaced by buses after World War II.

The port city of Fremantle and surrounds was served by a separate, non-connected network.

History

Horse tram

According to one source, the central city terminus of the short lived horse tramway was the General Post Office, which was then located within the Treasury Building, at the corner of St Georges Terrace and Barrack Street. The outlying terminus was said by the same source to be in East Perth. However, it now seems that there was never a horse tram provided for the carriage of passengers in Perth.

Rather, there was – it is believed – a horse tramway which ran from quarries just north of the city to the construction site of Government House situated in St Georges Terrace. For how long the horse tramway survived is not known, nor its exact route, as information has not yet been found, although research continues. It is known, however, that a horse omnibus system did exist.

Electric trams
The initial Perth tramway was operated by an English company, Perth Electric Tramways Limited. Construction started on 30 January 1899, with services commencing on 28 September 1899. The first line ran 4.8 kilometres along Hay Street, from East Perth near the WACA Ground to Thomas Street in West Perth. There was a spur line along Colin Street to Kings Park.

Further lines opened were:
Subiaco: along Hay Street and Rokeby Road to Thomas Street
Nedlands: extension from Subiaco along Thomas Street and Broadway to Nedlands Baths
Wellington Street East via Hill Street and Kensington Street to Trafalgar Road
Wellington Street West to Thomas Street
Mounts Bay Road to Point Lewis
Mount Lawley via Beaufort Street and Walcott Street to York Street
Victoria Park via The Causeway and Albany Highway
Lincoln Street via Lord Street
North Perth via Bulwer Street and Fitzgerald Street to Albert Street
Leederville via Newcastle Street and Oxford Street
Osborne Park extension from Leederville along Main Street to Royal Street

These routes, together with other city track resulted in a 37 kilometre network by June 1913. At that time there were 53 trams in the fleet: 44 four-wheel single truck cars, and nine larger bogie cars.

The Beaufort Street lines ran from a terminus at Barrack Square, which connected with the ferry service from Barrack Street Jetty.

Under the franchise agreement entered into by the Perth Electric Tramways, the Perth City Council was able to take ownership of the tramways upon its expiry. However the state government took ownership of the network by passing the Tramways Purchase Act 1912, which cancelled the reversionary rights held by the council. The Nedlands line transferred on 29 May 1913, followed by the other lines on 1 July 1913. The Osborne Park line that was operated by Town Properties was taken over by the government in December 1914.

The tramway network was operated by the Western Australian Government Railways (WAGR) until April 1949 when a separate Western Australian Government Tramways & Ferries department was established.

As the city expanded so did the tram network with the following openings between 1913 and 1930:
Nedlands extension of Mounts Bay Road line to Nedlands Baths
Inglewood via Beaufort Street to Dundas Road
Claremont via Thomas Street and Stirling Highway
South Perth Zoo via The Causeway and Angelo Street
Como from Mends Street Jetty via Labouchere Road
Maylands along Guildford Road to Ferguson Street
Mount Lawley, Walcott Street to Blake Street
Claremont via Mounts Bay Road and Stirling Highway
Westana Road from Claremont station via Victoria Avenue
Wembley via Woolwich Street and Cambridge Street to Nanson Street

The Wellington St West line had been abandoned by early 1920s while the Colin Street to Kings Park Road was abandoned in 1930.

In the 1930s, the following extensions opened:
Inglewood to Salisbury Street
Victoria Park to Patricia Street
Wembley to Alexander Street

The Westana Road to Claremont station section closed in 1935 and the Crawley to Nedlands line in 1938, while the Wellington Street East, Claremont and Wembley services were replaced by trolleybuses.

In the early 1940s, the final extensions opened:
Inglewood line extended by 400 metres to reach Grand Promenade
Victoria Park line extended by 1.6 kilometres to serve the munitions factory at Welshpool

Over a ten-year period beginning in 1948, all of the lines were gradually replaced by buses. The last tram ran on 19 July 1958.

Rolling stock
Over the years, a total of 130 trams were operated. Early examples were manufactured by J. G. Brill Company, Jackson and Sharp Company and St. Louis Car Company in the United States, with later examples by the WAGR's Midland Railway Workshops.

The trams were originally painted bright red; in 1903 a darker share of red was introduced. This was later replaced by WAGR red with gold lining. In 1927, a light grey livery was adopted and then in the 1930s the same cream and green livery as worn by the trolleybuses.

Some of the trams from the former Perth network are now preserved by the Perth Electric Tramway Society, at its heritage tramway in Whiteman Park, in the outer Perth suburb of Caversham.

Patronage

See also

Trams in Fremantle
Trams in Australia

Notes

Cited works

Further reading

External links

Perth
History of Perth, Western Australia
History of rail transport in Western Australia
Public transport in Perth, Western Australia
Perth
3 ft 6 in gauge railways in Australia
1899 establishments in Australia
1958 disestablishments in Australia